Schaus Buss AS is a bus company that operates routes in Vestby, Oslo on contract with Stor-Oslo Lokaltrafikk. The company was established in 1943 and has about 40 buses and tank trucks.

Bus companies of Viken
Companies based in Viken
Transport companies established in 1943
Public transport in Viken
Norwegian companies established in 1943